Paul Stuart Fiddes  (born 30 April 1947) is an English Baptist theologian and novelist.

Fiddes is Professor Emeritus of Systematic Theology in the University of Oxford, Principal Emeritus and Senior Research Fellow of Regent's Park College, Oxford (where he is director of the Project for the Study of Love in Religion), and a former Chairman of the Oxford Faculty of Theology.

Fiddes has been described as "one of the leading contemporary Baptist theologians", "one of the leading scholars of theology and literature writing today", "one of Christianity's most distinguished scholars", and "one of the foremost theological thinkers of the modern age". His book The Creative Suffering of God is "considered to be one of the major contributions to theology in the last decades of the 20th century".

Education 

Fiddes was educated at Drayton Manor Grammar School. In 1965 he went up to St Peter's College, Oxford to read Philosophy, Politics, and Economics. He quickly changed his course and ended up with a Double First in English Language and Literature and Theology. The relationship between these disciplines has formed a major part of his subsequent scholarship. He then embarked on a doctoral thesis entitled The hiddenness of wisdom in the Old Testament and later Judaism, which he completed in 1976, before spending a year at the Eberhard Karls University of Tübingen undertaking post-doctoral studies, and attending seminars of Jürgen Moltmann and Eberhard Jüngel.

Meanwhile, Fiddes studied at Regent's Park College (the Baptist permanent private hall at Oxford) for ordination as a minister in the Baptist Union of Great Britain. From 1972 to 1975 he was Junior Research Fellow in Old Testament and Hebrew at Regent's Park, became Fellow and Tutor in Christian Doctrine there in 1975 and from 1979 to 1985 he was additionally Lecturer in Theology at St Peter's.

Career 

Fiddes was a member of the Oxford Theology Faculty Board from 1989 to 2007, serving as Chairman 1996–98, and having been a senior member of the faculty since 1972. He was appointed Principal of Regent's Park in 1989 and was awarded the Title of Distinction of Professor of Systematic Theology in the University of Oxford in 2002. In 2007 he resigned the Principalship of Regent's Park and was appointed Principal Emeritus, Professorial Research Fellow, and Director of Research.

In 2004 Fiddes was elected an Honorary Fellow of St Peter's, on which occasion he was described as being "recognised internationally as one of the leading scholars in the fields of theology and literature". Later in that year, he was awarded the degree of Doctor of Divinity, the highest that the University confers. In 2002 he was chosen to preach the university Sermon on the Grace of Humility, and in 2005 he was appointed to deliver the Oxford Bampton Lectures, choosing as his topic Seeing the world and knowing God: ancient wisdom and modern doctrine. In 2004 he became an Honorary Doctor of Divinity of the University of Bucharest. He is also a Trustee Fellow of Georgetown College.

Fiddes is currently writing a biography of Charles Williams. He delivered a lecture on 'Charles Williams and a Vision of Co-Inherence' at the University Church of St Mary the Virgin.

Professional activities 

Fiddes is a member of the editorial board of Ecclesiology: The Journal for Ministry, Mission and Unity and Ecclesial Practices. He is a consultant editor for Studies in Baptist History and Thought, published by Paternoster Press, and a series editor of New Critical Thinking in Religion, Theology and Biblical Studies (Ashgate). He is General Editor of the Regent's Study Guides series, published jointly by the college and the American publisher Smyth & Helwys.

Fiddes has served as a member of ecumenical study commissions for the British Council of Churches and its successor Churches Together in Britain and Ireland, Chairman of the Doctrine and Worship Committee of the Baptist Union of Great Britain, Convenor of the Division for Theology and Education of the European Baptist Federation, Chair of the Baptist Doctrine and Inter-Church Cooperation Study Commission of the Baptist World Alliance. A committed ecumenist, Fiddes was Baptist Chair of the Anglican Communion-Baptist World Alliance International Conversations from 2000 until 2005 and has also been, together with the Most Reverend Dr Arthur J. Serratelli, Co-Moderator of the second series of Roman Catholic-Baptist World Alliance International Conversations (Second Series 2006–10). He is also an Ecumenical Representative to the General Synod of the Church of England. The Anglican community has honoured him in 2012 as an Honorary Ecumenical Canon of Christ Church Cathedral, Oxford (ex officio a member of the Greater Chapter of the cathedral) and as the first ever Ecumenical Prebendary of the Collegiate Church of St Endellion. He shares the latter honour with Rowan Williams, whom he "vested in the traditional fur almuce" upon the occasion of his admission and installation as a prebendary.

Lectures 

In 2009, Fides delivered the Holley-Hull Lectures at Samford University on the subject Telling the Christian Story in Our World Today. In 2009 he delivered the Nordenhaug Lectures at the International Baptist Theological Seminary of the European Baptist Federation in Prague on the subject "Post Modernity and Wisdom". These lectures will be prepared for future publication. (Previous Nordenhaug Lecturers include Miroslav Volf, Henry B. Wright Professor of Theology at Yale Divinity School, I. Howard Marshall, Professor of New Testament Exegesis in the University of Aberdeen, Elisabeth Schüssler Fiorenza, Krister Stendahl Professor of Divinity at Harvard Divinity School, Jürgen Moltmann, Professor of Systematic Theology in the University of Tübingen.) In 2010 (7–9 July) Fiddes was Main Speaker at the conference of the Australian and New Zealand Association of Theological Schools/Australian and New Zealand Society for Theological Studies, on "The Future of God", at Trinity College (University of Melbourne). At the same time he also spoke, as a keynote speaker, at the Melbourne College of Divinity Centenary Conference (5–7 July). Fiddes was a keynote speaker at "The Power of the Word: Poetry, Theology and Life", a conference held jointly between Heythrop College and the Institute of English Studies. Fiddes was also a keynote speaker at the 2010 Biennial Conference of the International Society for Religion, Literature and Culture, St Catherine's College, Oxford (23–26 September 2010) on the topic "Attending to the Other: Critical Theory and Spiritual Practice".

Studies of Fiddes's theology

Past Event and Present Salvation: the Christian Idea of Atonement (London: Darton, Longman, & Todd, 1989), one of Fiddes's most important works, was studied by the Reverend Father Eamonn Mulcahy, C.S.Sp., in his doctoral thesis at the Pontifical Gregorian University under the supervision of the distinguished Australian Jesuit scholar Gerald O'Collins. His thesis, which was entitled The Cause of Our Salvation: Soteriological Causality According to Some Modern British Theologians, 1988-98, also considered works by Colin Gunton, Vernon White, and John McIntyre. The thesis is now published as Eamonn Mulcahy, The Cause of Our Salvation: Soteriological Causality according to some Modern British Theologians, 1988-98 (Tesi Gregoriana Serie Teologia 140, Roma: Editrice Pontificia Università Gregoriana, 2007).

Fiddes is also the subject of Daniel John Sutcliffe-Pratt, Covenant and church for rough sleepers: a Baptist ecclesiology in conversation with the trinitarian pastoral theology of Paul S. Fiddes (Centre for Baptist History and Heritage studies, Occasional papers, vol. 14; Oxford: Regent's Park College, 2017).

The Revd Alistair Cuthbert, minister of Falkirk Baptist Church, is currently writing his doctoral thesis on the theology of Paul Fiddes at the University of St Andrews.

Novelist

Fiddes has recently published his first novel, A Unicorn Dies: A Novel of Mystery and Ideas (Oxford: Firedint Publishing, 2018). It is said to be, 'the first novel to reflect the modern cultural preoccupation with the image of the unicorn.' The Revd John Barton, DLitt, FBA, lately Oriel and Laing Professor of the Interpretation of Holy Scripture, has said of the book, 'This is such an intriguing and interesting novel. The plot is absolutely ingenious and both characterization and dialogue are wonderful.' A Unicorn Dies was also reviewed for the online newspaper The Baptist Times by Hugh Whittaker, Director of the Nissan Institute of Japanese Studies and Professor in the Economy and Business of Japan, University of Oxford, and Tutor for Admissions, St Antony's College. Professor Whittaker concludes, "A Unicorn Dies operates on several levels. It is both gripping and complex. I very much enjoyed this quest with Giles, and look forward to the next novel. It won’t be an easy act to follow." Fiddes's novel received a North American launch at University Baptist Church, Charlottesville, Virginia on 21 March 2018.

Publications

Fiddes is the sole author of 12 academic books, one novel, and more than 115 articles and book chapters. He has also written five books as a joint author and is additionally the editor or co-editor of 12 books. His work is published by some of the world's leading publishers, including Oxford University Press, Cambridge University Press, University of Wales Press, Mercer University Press, Sheffield Academic Press, Blackwell, Ashgate, Springer, Liturgical Press, Paternoster, Eerdmans, SPCK, SCM, DLT, and Marshall Pickering.

Fiddes has also been honoured with two Festschriften (books written by other scholars in his honour):

 Anthony Clarke, ed., For the Sake of the Church: Essays in Honour of Paul S. Fiddes, with a foreword by Rex Mason (Centre for Baptist History and Heritage studies, 3; Oxford: Centre for Baptist History and Heritage, Regent's Park College: 2014)
 Anthony Clarke and Andrew Moore, eds., Within the Love of God: Essays on the Doctrine of God in Honour of Paul S. Fiddes (Oxford: Oxford University Press, 2014)

List of sole-authored books

Novel

Academic books

 
 
 
 
 
  (Also published by Mercer University Press, 1991)

Further reading 
 Reviews of The Creative Suffering of God
 Warren McWilliams, review in Journal of the American Academy of Religion 58.4 (1990), 705-7
 Jeff B. Pool, review in The Journal of Religion 70.3 (1990), 471-472
 Roger E. Olson, review in Scottish Journal of Theology 43 (1990), 114-115
 Reviews of Freedom and Limit
 Review by Julian Gotobed, Boston University (2002)
 Review by Cleo McNelly Kearns, Department of Humanities, New Jersey Institute of Technology, Theology Today vol 49 no. 3 (October 1992), pp. 412–14

References

1947 births
Living people
People educated at Drayton Manor High School
English theologians
Alumni of Regent's Park College, Oxford
Fellows of Regent's Park College, Oxford
Alumni of St Peter's College, Oxford
Honorary Fellows of St Peter's College, Oxford
English Baptist ministers
Process theologians
English Baptist theologians
20th-century English theologians
Baptist writers
Principals of Regent's Park College, Oxford
English male non-fiction writers